Pierre Thomas Robin Neurath Bengtsson (born 12 April 1988) is a Swedish professional footballer who plays as a left back for Djurgårdens IF and the Sweden national team. Starting his career with AIK in the mid-2000s, he has spent most of his career in the Danish Superliga, and has also had stints in the Bundesliga and Ligue 1 before returning to Sweden in 2022. A full international since 2011, he has won more than 40 caps for Sweden and represented his country at UEFA Euro 2020.

Club career

AIK
Neurath Bengtsson started his senior career at AIK, where he made his debut in August 2006, against Östers IF at Råsunda Stadium.

FC Nordsjælland
After three and a half seasons at AIK, Neurath Bengtsson searched for more playtime and joined on 1 September 2009 the Danish Superliga FC Nordsjælland. Bengtsson began his Nordsjælland spell as back-up for Dennis Cagara, receiving his debut in the Danish Cup against AB on 23 September 2009. His first Superliga match was a 6–3 defeat against Brøndby IF on 4 October 2009.

From 1 November 2009, Neurath Bengtsson became a regular starter for FC Nordsjælland on the left back position. Through his performances, Bengtsson became in the interest of UEFA Champions League competitors Copenhagen in the summer 2010, and in the following winter transfer window, Bengtsson moved to Copenhagen.

FC Copenhagen
In Copenhagen, Neurath Bengtsson was a back-up for Oscar Wendt in his first half year. Nevertheless, Neurath Bengtsson appeared in 8 of 16 matches before Wendt moved on to join Borussia Mönchengladbach. Bengtsson's debut came as a substitute on 22 February 2011 in the UEFA Champions League round-of-16-match against Chelsea

In the 2011–12 season, Neurath Bengtsson began as first choice at left back. Through autumn, however, he was overtaken by Bryan Oviedo, and from 27 October to 15 April Neurath Bengtsson was only in the lineup twice. Oviedo was sold to Everton on 31 August 2012, and since Bengtsson has been the preferred left back in the club.

Mainz 05
On 23 November 2014, Mainz 05 announced that they had signed Neurath Bengtsson effective 1 January 2015. Since his contract with FC Copenhagen had expired 31 December 2014, he was available on a free transfer and signed a contract for three and a half years until summer 2018.

International career
Neurath Bengtsson was a part of the Swedish youth national teams, gaining 29 matches in total. He was a part of the Swedish squad at the 2009 UEFA Under-21 Championship.

On 19 January 2011, Bengtsson made his debut for the senior national team in a friendly against Botswana.

Despite playing regularly as left back for Sweden during the UEFA Euro 2020 qualifying, he was surprisingly not selected for the final squad. However, he was eventually called up to replace the injured Martin Olsson.

Career statistics

International

Honours
AIK

 Allsvenskan: 2009

Nordsjælland
 Danish Cup: 2009–10

Copenhagen
 Danish Superliga: 2010–11, 2012–13, 2018–19
 Danish Cup: 2011–12

References

External links

1988 births
Living people
People from Kumla Municipality
Swedish footballers
Association football fullbacks
AIK Fotboll players
FC Nordsjælland players
F.C. Copenhagen players
1. FSV Mainz 05 players
SC Bastia players
Vejle Boldklub players
Allsvenskan players
Danish Superliga players
Bundesliga players
Ligue 1 players
Sweden youth international footballers
Sweden under-21 international footballers
Sweden international footballers
UEFA Euro 2020 players
Swedish expatriate footballers
Swedish expatriate sportspeople in Denmark
Swedish expatriate sportspeople in Germany
Swedish expatriate sportspeople in France
Expatriate men's footballers in Denmark
Expatriate footballers in Germany
Expatriate footballers in France
Sportspeople from Örebro County